This is a list of places in Indonesia having standing links to local communities in other countries. In most cases, the association, especially when formalised by local government, is known as "town twinning" (usually in Europe) or "sister cities" (usually in the rest of the world).

A
Ambon

 Darwin, Australia
 Vlissingen, Netherlands

B
Banda Aceh

 Pendik, Turkey
 Samarkand, Uzbekistan

Bandung

 Braunschweig, Germany
 Cotabato City, Philippines
 Cuenca, Ecuador
 Fort Worth, United States
 Liuzhou, China
 Namur, Belgium
 Petaling Jaya, Malaysia
 Suwon, South Korea
 Yingkou, China

Bitung
 Davao City, Philippines

Bogor

 Gödöllő, Hungary
 Nanning, China
 St. Louis, United States

Bukittinggi
 Seremban, Malaysia

D
Denpasar

 Asenovgrad, Bulgaria
 Mossel Bay, South Africa
 Spassky District, Russia

Depok
 Ōsaki, Japan

J
Jakarta

 Bangkok, Thailand
 Beijing, China
 Berlin, Germany
 Casablanca, Morocco
 East Jerusalem, Palestine
 Hanoi, Vietnam
 Islamabad, Pakistan
 Istanbul, Turkey
 Jeddah, Saudi Arabia
 Kyiv, Ukraine
 Los Angeles, United States
 Maputo, Mozambique
 Moscow, Russia
 Pyongyang, North Korea
 Seoul, South Korea
 Shanghai, China
 Tokyo, Japan

Jayapura
 Vanimo, Papua New Guinea

K
Kupang
 Palmerston, Australia

M
Makassar

 Kuala Terengganu, Malaysia
 Lismore, Australia
 Peshawar, Pakistan
 Qingdao, China

Malang
 Fuqing, China

Manado
 Davao City, Philippines

Medan

 Chengdu, China
 Gwangju, South Korea
 Ichikawa, Japan
 Milwaukee, United States
 Penang Island, Malaysia

P
Padang

 Bà Rịa–Vũng Tàu, Vietnam
 Beit Lahia, Palestine
 Suzhou, China

Palembang
 Zhangzhou, China

Pontianak
 Kuching, Malaysia

S
Salatiga
 Mungyeong, South Korea

Semarang

 Beihai, China
 Brisbane, Australia
 Fuzhou, China

Siak
 Malacca City, Malaysia

Sidoarjo
 Jinan, China

Singkawang
 Taoyuan, Taiwan

Subang
 Gimcheon, South Korea

Surabaya

 Busan, South Korea
 Guangzhou, China
 Kaoshiung, Taiwan
 Kōchi, Japan
 Liverpool, England, United Kingdom
 Monterrey, Mexico
 Seattle, United States
 Shah Alam, Malaysia
 Varna, Bulgaria
 Xiamen, China

Y
Yogyakarta

 Baalbek, Lebanon
 Commewijne, Suriname
 Gangbuk (Seoul), South Korea
 Huế, Vietnam
 Le Mont-Dore, New Caledonia
 Paramaribo, Suriname

References

Indonesia geography-related lists
Foreign relations of Indonesia
Indonesia
Cities in Indonesia
Populated places in Indonesia